Kent County Cricket Club is one of the eighteen first-class county clubs within the domestic cricket structure of England and Wales. It represents the historic county of Kent. A club representing the county was first founded in 1842 but Kent teams have played top-class cricket since the early 18th century, and the club has always held first-class status. The current Kent County Cricket Club was formed on 6 December 1870 following the merger of two representative teams. Kent have competed in the County Championship since the official start of the competition in 1890 and have played in every top-level domestic cricket competition in England. The club's limited overs team is called the Kent Spitfires after the Supermarine Spitfire.

The county has won the County Championship seven times, including one shared victory. Four wins came in the period between 1906 and 1913 with the other three coming during the 1970s when Kent also dominated one-day cricket cup competitions. A total of 13 one-day cricket cup victories include eight between 1967 and 1978, with the last trophy won by the club coming in the 2022 Royal London One-Day Cup.

The club plays most of its home matches at the St Lawrence Ground in Canterbury, which hosts Canterbury Cricket Week, the oldest cricket festival in England. It also plays some home matches at the County Cricket Ground, Beckenham and the Nevill Ground, Royal Tunbridge Wells which hosts Tunbridge Wells Cricket Week.

Kent also field a women's team. Kent Women won the Women's County Championship a record eight times, most recently in 2019, and the Women's T20 title three times, most recently in 2016. It has traditionally played matches at the Polo Farm in Canterbury, but since 2016 has moved to be based mainly at Beckenham.

History
Cricket is generally believed to have originated out of children's bat and ball games in the areas of the Weald and North and South Downs of Kent and Sussex, and these counties and Surrey were the first centres of the game. There are records of the sport being played in Kent during the 17th century, although a match in 1705, probably at Town Malling, is the first that is definitely recorded as taking place within the county.

Early county teams to 1842

The first inter-county match took place between a Kent side and one from Surrey on Dartford Brent in 1709, although three matches between Kent and Sussex in 1728 are more likely to have been the first properly representative county matches. Teams under the patronage of landowners such as Edwin Stead of Dartford and Lord John Sackville, who established the Sevenoaks Vine ground on his Knole Park estate, increasingly became more representative of Kent as a county, and in 1744 a Kent team organised by Sackville played England at the Artillery Ground, a match which was commemorated in a poem by James Love. Under the patronage of Sackville's son, John Frederick Sackville, 3rd Duke of Dorset, and Sir Horatio Mann, Kent continued to field strong teams throughout the last quarter of the 18th century, and were, along with Surrey, the main challengers to the Hampshire teams organised primarily by the Hambledon Club.

The first inter-county match now considered to have first-class status was played between Kent and Surrey in 1773, and in 1787 a failed attempt to form a Kent County Club, with Dorset and Mann involved, was made at Coxheath. Inter-county matches declined towards the end of the 18th century, possibly as a result of a lack of investment during the Napoleonic Wars, although Kent teams continued to play matches. The resumption of matches between county sides in 1825, when Kent met Sussex at Brighton's Royal New Ground, saw matches organised by clubs in different parts of the county.

A second attempt to form a County Club was made during the 1830s at Town Malling, backed by lawyers Thomas Selby and Silas Norton, alongside George Harris, 3rd Baron Harris. Selby and Norton recruited Fuller Pilch from Norfolk, considered the best batsman in England, to play at Town Malling and maintain the cricket ground. Pilch played in Kent teams alongside players such as Alfred Mynn, Nicholas Felix, Ned Wenman and William Hillyer which dominated English cricket, winning 98 matches during the period, and the team is considered to have been the leading county side for six seasons out of the seven between 1837 and 1843. The expense of running county games meant that Town Malling proved too small to support a county club, and the club was wound up in 1841, Pilch moving to the Beverley club at Canterbury.

The first county clubs: 1842–1870

The Beverley Cricket Club was formed in 1835 at the Canterbury estate of brothers John and William de Chair Baker, initially playing in the St Stephen's district of the city before moving to the Beverley Ground in 1839. After the failure of the Town Malling club, the Bakers stepped in to organise Kent teams, with Pilch managing the ground. The Beverley club became the Kent Cricket Club on 6 August 1842, when it reconstituted itself during its annual cricket festival. The club was the first formal incarnation of Kent County Cricket Club, and the 1842 cricket festival is considered the first Canterbury Cricket Week.

The new Kent club played its initial first-class match against an England side at White Hart Field in Bromley on 25–27 August 1842, and initially the success of the club continued, with Kent considered the leading county side in 1843, 1847 and 1849. The club moved to the St Lawrence Ground on the eastern side of Canterbury in 1847, with Pilch once again moving to manage the ground. This was later established as the county's formal headquarters, although Kent continued to play matches on a variety of grounds around the county until well into the 20th century, rarely using the St Lawrence Ground for more than two or three matches a year.

As the team built around Pilch retired from cricket, the fortunes of the club declined, the county sometimes forced to field teams of up to 16 or to combine with other clubs in order to compete. Financial difficulties followed and on 1 March 1859 a second county club was formed at Maidstone to support the Canterbury-based club. The two clubs, the Canterbury club known as East Kent, the Maidstone club as West Kent, co-operated to an extent, although the relationship was later described as "anything but satisfactory". The standard of cricket played by the county side, generally organised by the West Kent club, remained poor and the county found it difficult to attract either the best amateur players or professionals to play, many amateurs only willing to appear during Canterbury Week. An 1870 meeting chaired by the 3rd Lord Harris at the Bull Inn at Rochester saw the two clubs merge to form the present day Kent County Cricket Club.

A single county club: 1870–1914

Initially the amalgamation of the clubs failed to improve performances on the pitch. The best amateurs still rarely appeared and Kent lacked a core of talented professionals to provide the team with a solid foundation. The 4th Lord Harris was elected to the General Committee in 1870 and became captain and secretary in 1875. He set about reforming the club with an "energetic administration", although performances improved only slowly at first and when the County Championship was formerly established in 1890 Kent were initially able to finish only in mid table.

The establishment of the Tonbridge Nursery in 1897 as a player development centre for young professionals was one of the key developments that lay the foundations for the successes of the pre-war period. The Nursery, which was run by Captain William McCanlis and set up and overseen by Tom Pawley who became the club's general manager in 1898, identified and provided organised coaching and match practise for young professionals for the first time. Players flourished and became the basis of the Kent team, gradually taking the place of the amateurs who had dominated the Kent teams of the 1870s and 80s. By 1906 around 60% of all appearances were by professionals, with bowlers such as Colin Blythe and Arthur Fielder forming the core of the Kent attack. Professional batsmen such as Punter Humphreys and James Seymour and all-rounders such as Frank Woolley became an increasing part of Kent's success, coming together with a group of "gifted" amateurs to produce strong batting lineups.

This Kent side was the first since the 1840s to enjoy a period of real success, winning the County Championship four times in the years between 1906 and 1914. The first title, in 1906, came under the captaincy of Cloudesley Marsham and was won on the last day of the season. Sides captained by Ted Dillon won three further Championships in 1909, 1910 and 1913 and the Kent XI was strong throughout the pre-war period. Blythe was the team's leading bowler throughout the period, taking over 100 wickets each season between 1902 and 1914, including 17 in one day against Northants in 1907.

Consistency but no Championships: 1919–1939
Blythe died at Paschendaele in 1917, although it is unlikely he would have played county cricket once the war was over. The Kent side, once the makeshift 1919 season had been played, continued to be consistently strong throughout the inter-war period, finishing in the top five of the County Championship table in all but one season between 1919 and 1934. Players such as Woolley, Wally Hardinge and Les Ames all played at the peak of their careers, whilst Blythe's bowling was replaced by Tich Freeman's. Freeman took 102 wickets for Kent in 1920 and then took at least 100 each season until 1936, taking 262 in 1933. He leads all Kent bowlers in wickets taken.

Kent scored 803 for 4 declared against Essex at Brentwood in 1934, with Bill Ashdown scoring 332, Ames 202 not out and Woolley 172. The total took just seven hours, with 623 runs scored on the first day alone and remains, as of 2022, Kent's highest score in first-class cricket, Ashdown's 332 runs remaining the highest individual score made for Kent. Arthur Fagg scored a unique two double centuries in the same match for Kent against Essex at Colchester in 1938, while Woolley scored over 1,000 runs for Kent in each season between 1920 and his retirement in 1938. In 1928 he made 2,894 runs for the county at a batting average of 59.06. He retired in 1938 after making 764 appearances for the county side, with 47,868 runs, 122 centuries and 773 catches for Kent―all county records.

Post-war rebuilding and the Second Golden Age: 1946–1978
Gerry Chalk had captained the side in 1939 when they had, once again, finished in the top five of the Championship, but he was killed during World War II and the post-war period saw Kent struggle to compete consistently. After two promising seasons under Bryan Valentine in 1946 and 1947, the county only finished in the top nine teams twice between 1948 and 1963.

The rebuilding of the side continued under David Clark's captaincy―Clark would later become chairman of the club. Colin Cowdrey, the first man to play 100 Test matches, made his Kent debut in 1950 and was appointed captain in 1957, following Doug Wright who was the first professional to captain the side. Wright took over 2,000 wickets with his brisk leg breaks and googlies between 1932 and 1957 and became the only player to take seven hat-tricks – six of them taken for Kent.

An improvement in performances began in the mid-1960s under the captaincy of Cowdrey and the management of former wicket-keeper Les Ames. A seventh-placed finish in 1964 was followed by fifth-place in 1965 and fourth-place in 1966 before the county finished as runners-up in 1967, winning the Gillette Cup in the same season. Another second-place finish in 1968 followed before the county won their first Championship since 1913 in 1970. Ten trophies were won during the 1970s, including a second Championship title 1978 and a shared title in 1977. The Sunday League was won in 1972, 1973 and 1976, the Benson & Hedges Cup in 1973, 1976 and 1978 and the Gillette Cup again in 1974 – six of the trophies between 1972 and 1976 under the captaincy of Mike Denness who had succeeded Cowdrey in 1972.

Recent history
After no trophies during the 1980s, Kent won the 1995 Axa Equity & Law League and the 2001 Norwich Union League. In August 2007, the side won the Twenty20 Cup for the first time, defeating Sussex in the semi-finals, with captain Rob Key scoring 68 not out. In the final they defeated Gloucestershire in a see-saw game where in the final over, chasing 148, they required 13 runs, winning with three balls to spare. Matthew Walker top scored for Kent in the final with 45 runs while Darren Stevens scored 30 not out from 21 balls, including hitting the winning runs. Earlier in the final, Ryan McLaren took a hat-trick.

In 2008, the county were relegated from to the Second Division of the County Championship for the first time. They won the Division in the 2009 season, but were relegated again at the end of the 2010 season and played in the division until 2018, with a best finish of second in 2016, failing to be promoted only due to a restructuring of the divisional system.

In November 2016, Kent accepted an invitation from the West Indies Cricket Board to compete in the 2016–17 Regional Super50 domestic List A tournament in January and February 2017. This was the first time that any English county side had competed in an overseas domestic competition. The invitation was partly due to the influence of former West Indian captain Jimmy Adams who had, until September 2016, been Kent's Head Coach and was followed by an invitation to take part in the competition again in 2018.

Kent were promoted to Division 1 at the end of the 2018 season, having finished second in Division 2 and retained their place in the top division in 2019. In 2021 the team won their first trophy for 14 years, beating Somerset in the T20 Blast final.

Grounds

Kent's main ground is the St Lawrence Ground in Canterbury. This ground has been used by the club since 1847 and Kent have played over 500 first-class matches at the ground. It is famous for having a tree, the St Lawrence Lime, on the playing field. The original tree, around which the ground was built, was broken in two by high winds in January 2005 and replaced by a smaller replacement lime tree later in the same year. The ground hosts the annual Canterbury Cricket Week, the oldest cricket festival in the world. This dates from 1842 and has been held at the ground since the club moved there.

Kent played their first official match at White Hart Field in Bromley in August 1842 and since then have used 29 different grounds within the historic county. Some of these grounds, although still in the historic county of Kent are now also within the Greater London area. Two outgrounds remain in regular use, the redeveloped County Cricket Ground, Beckenham and the Nevill Ground in Royal Tunbridge Wells. The latter ground hosts the Tunbridge Wells Cricket Week and has seen over 200 Kent home matches played on it. Former venues include Mote Park in Maidstone, which was used until 2005 and has been the venue for over 200 Kent first-class matches, as well as grounds in Gravesend, Tonbridge, Dover and Folkestone, all of which have had more than 100 home matches played on them.

The county's main offices are based at the St Lawrence Ground. Indoor cricket schools are in place at both this ground and at Beckenham which acts as a centre of excellence for player development in the west of the county.

Players

Kent's most notable former players include Colin Cowdrey, the first man to play 100 Test matches, Frank Woolley, Derek Underwood and wicket-keepers Les Ames and Alan Knott. All five men played Test cricket for England, making at least 40 Test match appearances. They are the only players to have stands named after them at the St Lawrence Ground, Kent's home ground in Canterbury. A total of 30 Kent players have been named as one of the Wisden Cricketers of the Year, most recently Zak Crawley and Darren Stevens in 2021 and Tammy Beaumont in 2019.

Other particularly notable former players include spin bowlers Colin Blythe and Tich Freeman. Blythe was a major force in the four County Championship wins in the years leading up to World War I and took 100 wickets in every season from 1902 to 1914. He played 17 Tests for England but was killed in action during World War I. A memorial at the St Lawrence Ground is dedicated to him. Freeman played during the period after World War I and took over 150 wickets in a season for Kent 14 times. He is the only bowler to take more than 300 wickets in an English season, a feat he achieved in 1928, and the only man to have taken all ten wickets in an innings three times. Fast bowler Graham Dilley represented England in 41 Test matches in the 1980s, whilst all-rounder Mark Ealham played in 64 one-day internationals in the 1990s and early 2000s.

Other than Ames and Knott, Kent has produced a number of other top class wicket-keepers. Fred Huish, who never played for England, is considered as the "first of a line of exceptional Kent wicket-keepers" which have included Godfrey Evans, who played 91 Tests for England, Geraint Jones, with 34 Test and 49 ODI appearances, as well as Edward Tylecote, George Wood and Hopper Levett all of whom were capped by the country. Paul Downton started his career at Kent as part of this line of players and the teams' current wicket-keeper, Sam Billings, has made one-day appearances for England.

Overseas players who have made a significant contribution to Kent cricket include West Indians John Shepherd, Eldine Baptiste, Bernard Julien and Carl Hooper and Pakistan captain Asif Iqbal all of whom played multiple seasons for the county. South Africans Martin van Jaarsveld, Justin Kemp and Andrew Hall have done the same, as has Australian Andrew Symonds. Other great world cricketers to have played for the county for single seasons include Sri Lankans Aravinda de Silva and Muttiah Muralitharan, India's Rahul Dravid and Australia's former Test captain Steve Waugh.

Kent cricket legends' walkway
As part of the redevelopment of Kent's home ground, the St Lawrence Ground in Canterbury, the county planned to develop a "legends' walkway" at the entrance to the ground. A public vote was held to select 12 former players of the club to honour in the walkway. The 12 players were named in June 2011. They included Alfred Mynn, who played for the county in the 19th century, Les Ames, Colin Blythe, Tich Freeman and Frank Woolley from the first half of the 20th century, Godfrey Evans and Doug Wright from the 1930s–50s era, and Colin Cowdrey, Alan Knott, Brian Luckhurst, John Shepherd and Derek Underwood from the teams of the 1960s and 70s. The first bricks were produced for the walkway in April 2012 although they were removed during development of the ground in 2017–18 and moved adjacent to the Nackington Road entrance.

Captains

As of 2021 the current club captain of Kent is Sam Billings, who was appointed in January 2018, replacing Sam Northeast. In total 33 men have been appointed as club captain, beginning with Lord Harris in 1875. Colin Cowdrey captained the side for the longest span in the County Championship era, serving between 1957 and 1971. Ted Dillon led the county to the County Championship title three times, the only man to captain Kent to more than one championship title. Mike Denness' side of the early 1970s won six one-day titles in his five years as captain.

Current squad

Of the players in the current squad Sam Billings, Joe Denly and Zak Crawley have appeared in Test matches and limited overs cricket for the England cricket team. Fred Klaassen has played ODI and T20 cricket for the Netherlands and Grant Stewart T20 Internationals for Italy.

 No. denotes the player's squad number, as worn on the back of their shirt.
  denotes players with international caps.
  denotes a player who has been awarded a county cap.

Coaching staff
Matt Walker is head coach of the side, having been appointed in January 2017 following former coach Jimmy Adams' decision to return to the Caribbean. Walker played for Kent for 16 seasons and was previously batting coach at Essex. The team's bowling coach is Simon Cook, another past player. Cook was head coach of the Hong Kong cricket team between 2015 and 2019 before joining Kent. Former Essex captain Ryan ten Doeschate was appointed as the side's batting coach in December 2021, but stayed with the side for only a year before joining Kolkata Knight Riders as their fielding coach. His successor, Alex Gidman, was appointed in February 2023. Gidman had previously been head coach at Worcestershire,

The Head of Talent Pathway in charge of the development of young cricketers at the club is former Second XI coach and player Min Patel. Patel works alongside Mark Dekker who had previously coached Kent Women. Former player Mark Ealham is a part-time coach with the club, also spending time coaching at The King's School, Canterbury.

Records

Frank Woolley, who played for Kent between 1906 and 1938, holds the record for the most appearances, most career runs and most runs in a season for the county.  He is the only man to score more than 100 centuries for Kent with 122 and is the county's fifth leading wicket taker. Bill Ashdown holds the record for the highest score for the county with 332 runs against Essex in 1934. He is one of only two men to have scored a triple-century for Kent, with two to his name, the other being Sean Dickson who scored 318 against Northants in 2017.

Tich Freeman is the county's leading wicket taker with 3,340 wickets. Freeman took more than 150 wickets for the county 14 times and holds the record for the most wickets in a season. Fellow spin bowler Colin Blythe has the best bowling figures in Kent's history taking 10/30 against Northamptonshire in 1907, with 17/48 in the match. Freeman took ten wickets in a match 128 times with Blythe achieving the same feat 64 times.

Along with Woolley and Freeman, Wally Hardinge, James Seymour and Derek Underwood are the only men with more than 500 first-class appearances for Kent.

Kent Women

The Kent Women cricket team plays in the London Championship and Women's Twenty20 Cup. The first recorded match by a Kent Women's team was in May 1935, with the team first appearing in the Women's Area Championship in 1980.

The side features a number of international players and is captained by England international Tammy Beaumont. They won the County Championship a record eight times during its existence, including the final tournament in 2019, and have won the Women's Twenty20 Cup three times, most recently in 2016. The team play the majority of their home matches at the County Cricket Ground, Beckenham. The Women's team is sponsored by Canterbury Christ Church University.

Gentlemen of Kent

The Gentlemen of Kent side, generally made up of amateur "gentlemen" cricketers from the county, played 48 first-class matches between 1830 and 1880. These matches were played almost exclusively against MCC and Gentlemen of England sides and an annual first-class fixture took place during the Canterbury Cricket Week between 1842 and 1866. The Gentlemen would also regularly play a one-day match against I Zingari, an amateur wandering side, during the Week and other matches were played on occasion, including against the touring Australian aboriginal side in 1868.

Sides named the Gentlemen of Kent had played cricket matches during the 18th century. The earliest known featuring a side using the name was a 1734 match against a Gentlemen of Sussex side at Sevenoaks Vine. The side was closely associated with the county side and had strong links to other amateur sides, including I Zingari and Band of Brothers, both of which would host tents during Canterbury Week, as well as to Old Stagers, an amateur drama group which performed during Canterbury Week.

Kent Cricket Academy

Kent established an academy in 2003 with the aim of developing future first-class cricketers. The academy is based at the St Lawrence Ground in Canterbury and makes use of the Ames-Levett Sports Centre at the ground. It has produced over 25 first-term players for the county, including current club captain Sam Northeast and senior England internationals Tammy Beaumont, Sam Billings, Joe Denly, Natasha Farrant, Lydia Greenway and Jo Watts. The leading academy scholar is awarded the John Aitken Gray trophy each year. Past winners have included county First XI players Daniel Bell-Drummond, Alex Blake and Ollie Robinson.

The academy was established by former wicket-keeper Simon Willis. Paul Farbrace and Philip Relf held lead coaching roles within the scheme until Willis was appointed as high performance director in 2011, serving in the role until May 2016 when he was appointed the high performance manager of Sri Lanka Cricket. Former Kent and England spin bowler Min Patel took over the running of the academy on an interim basis following Willis' departure before becoming Second XI coach in January 2017, with former Shropshire wicket-keeper Jason Weaver taking over the role as high performance director, the two jobs replacing Willis' former role. When Weaver left the club in 2019, Patel took over the role, becoming the club's Head of Talent Pathway and working alongside former women's coach Mark Dekker.

Honours
Kent have won the County Championship seven times, including one shared title. Four of their wins came in the years before World War I between 1906 and 1913, Ted Dillon captaining the side to three of their titles. The county had to wait until the 1970s to win their other Championship titles, winning outright in 1970 and 1978 and sharing the title with Middlesex in 1977.  Kent have finished as runner-up in the Championship on 12 occasions, most recently in 2004. The County Championship Second Division title was won by the county in 2009.

The county First XI has also won a number of limited overs competition trophies. Eight trophies were won between 1967 and 1978, six times by teams led by Mike Denness. Three more trophies have followed in 1995, 2001 and 2007 and, most recently, the team won the 2021 T20 Blast. Kent finished runners-up in the 2008 T20 competition, the 2008 Friends Provident Trophy and the 2018 Royal London One-Day Cup.

The Second XI Championship title has been won nine times by the county, including one shared win in 1987. As of 2019 this represents a record number of victories in the competition. Four of the victories have occurred in the 21st century, with the most recent in 2012. The Second XI Trophy one-day competition was won in 2002 and 2019 and the county won the Minor Counties Championship twice in the 1950s when first-class Second XI's entered the competition.

Kent's women have won the Women's County Championship a record eight times, most recently in 2019, and have been runners-up five times since the competition was established in 1997. The women's side has also won the Twenty20 Championship three times, in 2011, 2013 and 2016.

First XI honours
 County Championship (6) – 1906, 1909, 1910, 1913, 1970,  1978; shared (1) – 1977Runners-up (12): 1988, 1908, 1911, 1919, 1928, 1967, 1968, 1972, 1988, 1992, 1997, 2004County Championship Division Two (1) – 2009Runners-up (2): 2016, 2018
County Championship Division Three (1) – 2021
 One-Day Cup (3) – 1967, 1974, 2022Runners-up (5): 1971, 1983, 1984, 2008, 2018
 National League (5) – 1972, 1973, 1976, 1995, 2001Runners-up (4): 1970, 1979, 1993, 1997
 Benson & Hedges Cup (3) – 1973, 1976, 1978Runners-up (5): 1977, 1986, 1992, 1995, 1997
 Twenty20 Cup (2) – 2007, 2021Runners-up (1): 2008

Second XI honours
 Minor Counties Championship (2)  – 1951, 1956
 Second XI Championship (8) – 1961, 1969, 1970, 1976, 2002, 2005, 2006, 2012; shared (1) – 1987
 Second XI Trophy (2) – 2002, 2019

Women's honours
 Women's County Championship winners (8) – 2006, 2007, 2009, 2011, 2012, 2014, 2016, 2019Runners-up (5) – 2004, 2005, 2008, 2010, 2015
 Women's County Twenty20 Championship winners (3) – 2011, 2013, 2016

Notes

References

Bibliography
Association of Cricket Statisticians and Historians (ACS) (1985) A Guide to Important Cricket Matches Played in the British Isles, 1709–1863 (second edition). Nottingham: ACS. (Available online. Retrieved 2022-04-04.)
Birley D (1999) A Social History of English Cricket. London: Aurum Press. 
Burrowes P, Knight L, Oakes S, Barnard D, Francis P, Carlaw D, Milton H (eds) (2021) Kent County Cricket Club Annual 2021. Canterbury: Kent County Cricket Club.
Carlaw D (2020) Kent County Cricketers A to Z. Part One: 1806–1914 (revised edition). (Available online at the Association of Cricket Statisticians and Historians. Retrieved 2020-12-21.)
Ellis C, Pennell M (2010) Trophies and Tribulations. London: Greenwich Publishing. .
Hignell A (2002) Rain Stops Play: Cricketing Climates. London: Abingdon. 
Hughes S (2009) And God Created Cricket. London: Transworld Publishers. 
Lewis P (2013) For Kent and Country. Brighton: Reveille Press. .
McCann TJ, ed (2004) Sussex cricket in the Eighteenth Century. Lewes: Sussex Record Society.  (Available online at the University of Michigan library. Retrieved 2022-04-04.)
Milton H (1992) Cricket Grounds of Kent. Nottingham: The Association of Cricket Statisticians and Historians. (Available online. Retrieved 2022-04-04.)
Milton H (2020) Kent County Cricket Grounds. Worthing: Pitch Publishing. 
Moore D (1988) The History of Kent County Cricket Club. London: Christopher Helm. 
Moseling M, Quarrington T (2013) A Half-Forgotten Triumph: The story of Kent's County Championship title of 1913. Cheltenham: SportsBooks. .
 Rice J (2019) Stories of Cricket’s Finest Painting. Worthing: Pitch Publishing. 
Underdown D (2000) Start of Play: Cricket and Culture in Eighteenth Century England London: Allen Lane.

Further reading
 Harris & Ashley-Cooper FS (1929) Kent Cricket Matches 1719–1880. Canterbury: Gibbs & Sons.

External links
Official Kent County Cricket Club Website
Official Website of Kent Cricket Community Team

 
History of Kent
Cricket in Kent
1842 establishments in England
Cricket clubs established in 1842
English first-class cricket teams
Sport in the London Borough of Bromley
City of Canterbury
Borough of Maidstone
Sport in Royal Tunbridge Wells